Nocardiosis is an infectious disease affecting either the lungs (pulmonary nocardiosis) or the whole body (systemic nocardiosis). It is due to infection by a bacterium of the genus Nocardia, most commonly Nocardia asteroides or Nocardia brasiliensis.

It is most common in adult males, especially those with a weakened immune system. In patients with brain nocardia infection, mortality exceeds 80%; in other forms, mortality is 50%, even with appropriate therapy.

It is one of several conditions that have been called "the great imitator". Cutaneous nocardiosis commonly occurs in immunocompetent hosts and is caused in 80% of cases by Nocardia brasiliensis.

Signs and symptoms
Pulmonary infection
 Produces a virulent form of pneumonia (progressive)
 Night sweats, fever, cough, chest pain
 Pulmonary nocardiosis is subacute in onset and refractory to treatment with standard antibiotics
 Symptoms are more severe in immunocompromised individuals
 Radiologic studies show multiple pulmonary infiltrates, with a tendency to central necrosis
Neurological infection
 Headache, lethargy, confusion, seizures, sudden onset of neurological deficit
 CT scan shows cerebral abscess
 Nocardial meningitis is difficult to diagnose
Cardiac conditions
 Nocardia has been highly linked to endocarditis as a main manifestation
 In recorded cases, it has caused damage to heart valves whether natural or prosthetic
Lymphocutaneous disease
 Nocardial cellulitis is akin to erysipelas but is less acute
 Nodular lymphangeitis mimics sporotrichosis with multiple nodules alongside a lymphatic pathway
 Chronic subcutaneous infection is a rare complication and osteitis may ensue
 May be misidentified and treated as a staph infection, specifically superficial skin infections
 Cultures must incubate more than 48 hours to guarantee an accurate test
Ocular disease
 Very rarely, nocardiae cause keratitis
 Generally there is a history of ocular trauma
Disseminated nocardiosis
 Dissemination occurs through the spreading enzymes possessed by the bacteria
 Disseminated infection can occur in very immunocompromised patients
 It generally involves both lungs and brain
 Fever, moderate or very high can be seen
 Multiple cavitating pulmonary infiltrates develop
 Cerebral abscesses arise later
 Cutaneous lesions are very rarely seen
 If untreated, the prognosis is poor for this form of disease

Causes
Normally found in soil, these organisms cause occasional sporadic disease in humans and animals throughout the world. Another well publicized find is that of Nocardia as part of the oral microflora. Nocardia spp. have been reported in the normal gingivae and periodontal pockets along with other species such as Actinomyces, Arthromyces and Streptomyces spp.

The usual mode of transmission is inhalation of organisms suspended in dust. Another very common method is by traumatic introduction, especially in the jaw. This leads to the entrance of Nocardia into the blood stream and the propagation of its pathogenic effects. Transmission by direct inoculation through puncture wounds or abrasions is less common. Generally, nocardial infection requires some degree of immune suppression.

A weakened immune system is a general indicator of a person who is more susceptible to nocardiosis, such as someone who already has a disease that weakens their immune system. Additionally, those with low T-cell counts or other complications involving T-cells can expect to have a higher chance of becoming infected. Besides those with weak immune systems, a local traumatic inoculation can cause nocardiosis, specifically the cutaneous, lymphocutaneous, and subcutaneous forms of the disease. There is no racial pattern in the risk of becoming infected with Nocardiosis.

Diagnosis
Diagnosis of nocardiosis can be made by a doctor using various techniques. These techniques include, but are not limited to: a chest x-ray to analyze the lungs, a bronchoscopy, a brain/lung/skin biopsy, or a sputum culture. However, diagnosis may be difficult. Nocardiae are gram positive, weakly acid-fast, branching rod-shaped bacteria and can be visualized by a modified Ziehl–Neelsen stain such as the Fite-Faraco method. In the clinical laboratory, routine cultures may be held for insufficient time to grow nocardiae, and referral to a reference laboratory may be needed for species identification. Pulmonary infiltration and pleural effusion are usually detected via x-ray.

Treatment
Nocardiosis requires at least 6 months of treatment, preferably with trimethoprim/sulfamethoxazole or high doses of sulfonamides. In patients who do not respond to sulfonamide treatment, other drugs, such as ampicillin, erythromycin, or minocycline, may be added.

Treatment also includes surgical drainage of abscesses and excision of necrotic tissue. The acute phase requires complete bed rest; as the patient improves, activity can increase.

A new combination drug therapy (sulfonamide, ceftriaxone, and amikacin) has also shown promise.

Prognosis 
The prognosis of nocardiosis is highly variable. The state of the host's health, site, duration, and severity of the infection all play parts in determining the prognosis. Currently, skin and soft tissue infections have a 100% cure rate, and pleuropulmonary infections have a 90% cure rate with appropriate therapy. The cure rate falls to 63% with those infected with disseminated nocardiosis, with only half of patients surviving infections that cause brain abscess. Additionally, 44% of people who are infected in the central nervous system (CNS) die, increasing to 85% if that person has an already weakened immune system. There are no preventative treatments for nocardiosis. The only recommendation is to protect open wounds to limit entrance of the bacterium.

Epidemiology 
Although there are no international data available on worldwide infection rates per year, there are roughly 500–1000 documented cases of nocardiosis per year in the US. Most of these cases occur in men, as there is a 3:1 ratio of male of female cases annually; however, this difference may be due to exposure frequency rather than susceptibility differences. From an age perspective, it is not highly more prevalent in one age group than another. Cutaneous nocardiosis is slightly more common in middle aged men, but as a whole, all age groups are susceptible. There is no racial pattern in the risk of becoming infected with nocardiosis.

References

External links 

 Webmd article on Nocardiosis

Bacterium-related cutaneous conditions
Bacterial diseases
Rare infectious diseases